Savo Štrbac (born 1949) is a Croatian Serb lawyer and author. He is best-known for being the director of the Serbian NGO "Veritas" that documents with the history of the Republic of Serbian Krajina and locates missing war victims.

Early life and education
Štrbac was born in Raštević, near Benkovac, People’s Republic of Croatia. He earned a degree in law from the University of Zagreb.

Career 
From 1977 to 1990, he worked as a judge of the Municipal Court in Benkovac and of the District Court in Zadar. During the Breakup of Yugoslavia, he was involved in the work of the RSK Commission for Prisoner Exchanges, at first as a Commission member and from 1993 as its chairman. The same year, he also became Secretary of the RSK.

Since 1994, he worked with the now-former chief prosecutor at the ICTY, Carla del Ponte, in preparing indictments against Croatian generals in the Trial of Gotovina et al. After the convictions of Ante Gotovina and Mlden Markač were reversed, he stated that "Croats gave huge money for generals' freedom".

Personal life 
He has two children and lives in Belgrade.

Works
 Ravni kotari - Maslenica 1993, Informaciono-dokumentacioni centar „Veritas“
 Krvavi spetembar u Lici - 1993, Informaciono-dokumentacioni centar „Veritas“, 1996
 Miljevački plato - juni 1992., Informaciono-dokumentacioni centar „Veritas“, 1996
 Srpska zapadna Slavonija - maj 1995, Informaciono-dokumentacioni centar „Veritas“, Svetigora, 1997
 Srpska Krajina - avgust 1995, Informaciono-dokumentacioni centar „Veritas“, Svetigora, 1997
 Nestala lica na području Hrvatske, Informaciono-dokumentacioni centar „Veritas“, Art-print, Banjaluka
 Sudbine ljudi sa potrežnih lista, Informaciono-dokumentacioni centar „Veritas“, Belgrade, 1999
 Zvona Svetog Ćirita, Informaciono-dokumentacioni centar „Veritas“, Banjaluka, 2000
 Zvona sudbine, Informaciono-dokumentacioni centar „Veritas“, Banjaluka, 2005

References

1949 births
Living people
People from Benkovac
Serbs of Croatia
Yugoslav judges
Serbian politicians
Faculty of Law, University of Zagreb alumni
Republic of Serbian Krajina
20th-century Serbian lawyers